Pasquale Jannaccone (18 May 1872 in Naples - 22 December 1959 in Turin) was an Italian economist nominated senator for life by Luigi Einaudi in 1950.

1872 births
1959 deaths
Italian economists
Italian life senators